Kameswaram is a residential, agricultural and fishing based area in Nagapattinam District. It is a classical village near Vailankanni in Tamil Nadu, India.

The village has Keeran Lake, St. Sebasthiyar Higher Secondary School, Sat Cohaj Hospital, Kameswarar Temple, shrine, mosque, beach and Beach Temple (Lord Shiva). The main source of income for its residents include agriculture and fishing. It has very good rainfall, ground water level.

In 2018, it was one of the villages heavily affected by Cyclone Gaja. In 2004, a tsunami destroyed everything and negatively affected fishermen, farmers, livestocks and more.

References

Villages in Nagapattinam district